Asmus Tietchens (born 3 February 1947, in Hamburg), who also records under the monikers Hematic Sunsets and Club of Rome, is a German composer of avant-garde music.
Tietchens became interested in experimental music and musique concrète as a child, and began recording sound experiments in 1965 with electronic musical instruments, synthesizers and tape loops. In the 1970s he met producer Okko Bekker, and the two formed a decades-long partnership. Peter Baumann (of Tangerine Dream) heard a recording of Tietchens' music and offered to produce an album; the result was Nachtstücke, Tietchens' 1980 offering on Egg Records. His early recordings feature more accessible synthesized music, but beginning with Formen Letzer Hausmusik, his 1984 release for Nurse With Wound's label United Dairies, he began moving toward more abstract sound collages. He has taught acoustics in Hamburg since 1990.

Discography
 1978 Liliental with Liliental
 1980 Nachtstücke
 1981 Biotop
 1981 Musik aus der Grauzone
 1982 Spät-Europa
 1982 In die Nacht
 1982 Musik im Schatten
 1982 Musik an der Grenze
 1983 Litia
 1983 Musik unter Tage
 1984 Formen letzter Hausmusik
 1985 Seuchengebiete
 1985 Cripple Story
 1985 Große Statik as Club of Rome
 1986 Geboren um zu dienen
 1986 Watching the Burning Bride with Terry Burrows
 1987 Zwingburgen des Hedonismus
 1987 Notturno
 1988 Aus Freunde am Elend
 1988 Face to Face, Vol. 1 Split with Die Form
 1988 E with Okko Bekker
 1988 Linea
 1989 Abfleischung
 1989 Marches funébres
 1990 Stupor Mundi
 1991 Sinkende Schwimmer
 1991 Grav with PGR and Merzbow
 1991 Monoposto with C.V. Liquidsky
 1991 Raum 318
 1992 Seuchengebiete 2
 1992 Daseinsverfehlung
 1992 Five Manifestoes with PBK
 1993 Das Fest ist zu Ende. Aus
 1993 DBL_FDBK with Arcane Device
 1994 Die Nacht aus Blei
 1995 Eisgang
 1995 Asmus Tietchens. Vidna Obmana with Vidna Obmana
 1995 Itineraire with Frans de Waard, Achim Wollscheid, Giancarlo Toniutti, and Bernhard Günter
 1996 Ptomaine
 1996 Das Vieh und sein Vater
 1996 Speiseleitung with Arcane Device
 1996 Rattenheu
 1996 Papier ist geduldig
 1997 Dämmerattacke
 1998 Seuchengebiete 3
 1998 Burning the Watching Bride with Terry Burrows
 1998 Repetitive Movement with Achim Wollscheid
 1998 Musik aus dem Aroma Club as Hematic Sunsets
 1999 Glimmen
 1999 Motives for Recycling with Vidna Obmana
 1999 6.9.1998
 1999 Stockholmer Totentanz with Okko Bekker
 1999 Was bleibt
 1999 Phosphor
 1999 Von Mund zu Mund 1
 1999 Schritt Um Schritt split with Robert Rutman
 2000 Rendezvouz im Aroma Club as Hematic Sunsets
 2000 Von Mund zu Mund 2
 2000 Alpha-Menge
 2000 Von Mund zu Mund 3
 2000 Kapotte Muziek by Asmus Tietchens
 2000 The Scorpions. Studio-Outtakes 1–6, 7–15 Split with Felix Kubin
 2001 Kontakt der Jünglinge 1 with Thomas Köner
 2001 Beta-Menge
 2001 Flussdichte with David Lee Myers
 2001 Kontakt der Jünglinge 0 with Thomas Köner
 2002 The Shifts Recyclings with Vidna Obmana
 2002 Gamma-Menge
 2002 Leuchtidioten
 2002 Kontakt der Jünglinge -1 with Thomas Köner
 2003 Sieben Stücke with Jon Mueller
 2003 Heidelberger Studien 1–6
 2003 Kontakt der Jünglinge n with Thomas Köner
 2003 Delta-Menge
 2003 Hunde I with Xyramat and TBC
 2003 FT+
 2004 Frühruin with Thomas Köner
 2004 6000 with David Lee Myers
 2004 Zu Gast im Aromaclub as Hematic Sunsets, with Gästen
 2004 Hunde II with Jetzmann and TBC
 2004 Weihnachten im Aroma Club as Hematic Sunsets with Okko Bekker
 2004 Eine ganze Menge
 2005 Epsilon-Menge
 2006 Verstreutes 2
 2006 Zwei Stücke
 2006 Zeta-Menge
 2007 4K7
 2007 Musik hinter Glas
 2007 Fabrication with Richard Chartier
 2007 Prefabrication
 2007 YAK with Y-Ton-G und Kouhei Matsunaga
 2007 Weihnachten im Aroma Club 2007 as Hematic Sunsets
 2007 Acht Stücke with Jon Mueller
 2007 Eta-Menge
 2008 Teils Teils
 2009 Aroma Club Paradox as Hematic Sunsets
 2009 Eine Menge Papier
 2009 3 Wishes Split with Stefanie Ressin
 2009 Flächen mit Figuren
 2010 Fabrication 2 with Richard Chartier
 2010 Abraum
 2011 Soirée
 2011 Untitled Split with Kouhei Matsunaga
 2012 Moebius + Tietchens with Dieter Moebius
 2013 Tarpenbek
 2013 Fast ohne Titel, Korrosion

References

External links
Official Website
Asmus Tietchens at Discogs

1947 births
Living people
Avant-garde composers
Brain Records artists
German composers
German electronic musicians
German experimental musicians
Soleilmoon artists